Lhundub Sopa (born Tsang, 1923 – August 28, 2014) was a Tibetan monk.

Biography

Sopa was born in Tibet. He became a novice monk and entered Gaden Chokor Monastery in 1932. In 1941, he joined Sera Monastery in Lhasa. He was chosen as one of the Dalai Lama's debate examiners during the annual Prayer Festival in 1959.

Geshe Sopa went in exile in India following the 1959 Tibetan uprising. In 1962, he was awarded the degree of Lharampa Geshe. At the request of Tenzin Gyatso, 14th Dalai Lama, he moved to the USA with three other monks (Sharpa Tulku, Khamlung Tulku and Lama Kunga) that same year to learn English and to study American culture.

In 1967, Sopa was invited by Richard Robinson to join the faculty of the pioneer Buddhist Studies Program at the University of Wisconsin–Madison. Sopa was the first Tibetan to be tenured at an American university. Holding various positions through the years, when he retired in 1997, he became Emeritus Professor in the Department of South Asian Studies. During that time, Sopa trained many of the first generation of respected Buddhist scholars and translators in the USA, including Jeffrey Hopkins, José Cabezón, John Makransky, Edward W. Bastian, and Zorba Paster.

To meet the request of students for Buddhist teachings, Sopa founded the Deer Park Buddhist Center in Oregon, Wisconsin in 1976. The Kalachakra Tantra initiation was given in the West for the first time at Deer Park July, 1981.

He was a trustee on the International Committee for Peace Council. 

Sopa died of natural causes at Deer Park Buddhist Center in August 2014, age 92.

Bibliography
 Cutting through appearances: Practice and Theory of Tibetan Buddhism, co-authored with Jeffrey Hopkins 
 Wheel of Time: the Kalachakra in Context, co-authored with Roger Jackson and John Newman
 Peacock in the Poison Grove: Two Buddhists Texts for Training the Mind
 Steps on the Path to Enlightenment: A Commentary on the Lamrim Chenmo
Volume 1: The Foundation Practices
Volume II Karma
Volume III Way of the Bodhisattva
Volume IV Śamatha
Volume V Insight
 Teachings from Tibet: Guidance from Great Lamas, co-authored
 Like a Waking Dream: the Autobiography of Geshe Lhundrub Sopa 
 The Crystal Mirror of Philosophical Systems: A Tibetan Study of Asian Religious Thought

References

External links
FPMT on Geshe Sopa
Deer Park Buddhist Center
James Blumenthal interviews Geshe Sopa on the three types of spiritual beings

2014 deaths
Geshes
Tibetan Buddhism writers
Tibetan Buddhists from Tibet
Chinese emigrants to India
Indian emigrants to the United States
1923 births
People from Oregon, Wisconsin